Sarah's Secret (foaled March 20, 2008 in Kentucky) is an American Thoroughbred racehorse.

She was owned by Joan Hadley Thoroughbreds and trained by Kathy Walsh. David Flores rode Sarah's Secret in her first three starts. In her fourth start she was ridden by Rafael Bejarano.

Sarah's Secret was sired by Leroidesanimaux, who also sired in the same season as 2011 Kentucky Derby winner Animal Kingdom. She is out of Luhuk's mare Sarasota.

2010 season

On August 22, 2010, Sarah's Secret won her first start and defeated only 4 other fillies. She broke her maiden in a Maiden Special Weight going  furlongs at Del Mar. She was ridden by David Flores and won by  lengths over the favorite May Day Rose.

2011 season

On May 1, 2011, Sarah's Secret won a 6-furlong allowance race by  lengths.  This time she raced on turf. She was ridden by David Flores, carrying 122 lbs.

On June 11, 2011, Sarah's Secret got her first stakes win in the Honeymoon Handicap, defeating the favorite Star Billing. She was ridden by Rafael Bejarano for the first time.

On July 24, 2011, Sarah's Secret run in San Clemente Handicap as a favorite, but she finished 6th.

Retired from racing, at the November 2012 Keeneland sale  she was purchased for $185,000 as a broodmare prospect by William S. Farish III to stand at his Lane's End Farm near Lexington, Kentucky.

Career statistics

Pedigree

2008 racehorse births
Racehorses bred in Kentucky
Racehorses trained in the United States
Thoroughbred family 18-a